Wir sitzen alle im selben Boot (German for We Are All in the Same Boat) is the third album released by German disco group Dschinghis Khan. It features the singles "Pistolero", "Loreley", "Wir sitzen alle im selben Boot", and "What Shall We Do with the Drunken Sailor". "Pistolero" and "Loreley" were also recorded in English and released internationally. In addition, "Pistolero" was recorded in Spanish and released in Latin American markets. At the time of the album's release, the group was reduced from six to five members, with Steve Bender having left the group prior to the album's recording.

Track listing

Charts

References

External links
 
 

1981 albums
Dschinghis Khan albums
German-language albums